John Henry Hale (June 5, 1878 – March 27, 1944) was a prominent surgeon, professor, and philanthropist who played a prominent role in establishing the black medical community. Hailed as the "dean of American Negro surgeons," Hale conducted over 30,000 surgeries, mainly at Meharry Medical College and Millie E. Hale Hospital. He practiced medicine and taught at Meharry for 29 years, mentoring a plethora of black surgeons.

Together with his wife, Millie, Hale did much philanthropic work in his local black community in Nashville, Tennessee. Together, they distributed food to the poor, offered much of their medical care for free, ran free medical classes and lectures, and converted their home into a local community center — a hosting place for many local community organizations.

Hale was a president of National Medical Association in 1935. He is a recipient of a Distinguished Service Medal. His name was given to medical organizations, a medical center in California, and a public housing project in Nashville.

Early life and education 
Hale was born June 5, 1878, in Estill Springs, Tennessee into the family of Aaron Hale (1849–1914) and Emma (Gray) Hale (1848– ?). He received his elementary education in Estill Springs, then moved to Nashville in the 1890s. In 1901, Hale graduated from Walden University in Nashville (also known as Central Tennessee College) with a B.S. degree. For the next four years, he attended Meharry Medical College graduating as a Doctor of Medicine in 1905. During his years in Meharry, Hale attended Daniel Hale Williams' surgical clinics, which later influenced Hale's decision to specialize as a surgeon. Soon after his graduation, on December 20, 1905, Hale married his first wife, Nashvillian Millie Essie (Gibson) Hale.

Medical career 
After his graduation from Meharry Medical College, Hale was invited to join the college in a full-time capacity as faculty member and medical practitioner at the hospital adjoined to the college. The hospital was founded in 1900 by Robert F. Boyd as a 27-bed Mercy Hospital on South Cherry Street. In 1910, it was renamed to Hubbard Hospital and moved to First Avenue South. Hale started as instructor in histology and remained in this position from 1905 to 1911.

However, inspired by Daniel Hale Williams' surgical clinics, Hale's ambition was to become a surgeon. As relevant post-graduate schooling was not available at Meharry, Hale travelled to Mayo Clinic in Rochester, Minnesota, Crile Clinic in Cleveland, Ohio, and the University of Chicago to advance his knowledge in surgery. Hale also started practicing surgery as early as 1906, taking indigent cases in Nashville. While teaching histology, Hale briefly headed the tumor clinic at Mercy hospital in 1906 and 1907,; he then served a clinical instructor from 1911 to 1912.

Hale gradually became a "self-taught" surgeon who would take on most surgeries — a universalism occasionally practiced at that era. In 1922, Hale became the director of the Division of Surgery at Meharry; then in 1923, the chief of staff of the Department of Surgery at Hubbard Hospital; and in 1924, a clinical professor of surgery in Meharry Medical College. He advanced to full professorial position in 1931, and in 1938 became the chairman of the Department of Surgery at Hubbard Hospital. Hale is credited for performing approximately 30,000 surgeries before his death in 1944. For his "outstanding contribution to the Negro medical profession," Hale was posthumously awarded the Distinguished Service Medal. The ceremony was performed by Ulysses G. Dailey, the first black surgeon recognized by the United States medical profession.

Millie E. Hale Hospital 

Following the sudden death of his two-month old son, John Henry Hale Jr., in 1916, Hale and his wife, Millie E. Hale founded a new hospital to treat black community of Nashville, which numbered 35,000 at the time. His wife was the driving force and supervisor of the new institution, which was named after her, while Hale became the surgeon-in-chief. The hospital opened at 523 Seventh Avenue and grew from 12 beds in 1916 to 75 beds in 1922. The hospital successfully passed all the standards set by the state of Tennessee, getting average scores of 91%. By 1923, over 5,000 surgeries had been performed at this hospital, most by Hale.

After the premature death of his wife in 1930, Hale maintained the Millie E. Hale Hospital for eight more years. In 1938, however, Meharry management insisted that Hale could not stretch himself so broadly, and the hospital closed, its staff and patients absorbed by Hubbard Hospital.

Other medical work 
Following the example of his mentor, Daniel Hale Williams, Hale conducted multiple teaching clinics all over the American South to spread his surgical knowledge and practice among fellow black doctors.

Hale was also a patron of the Tuskegee Institute, a historically black university in Alabama. He served as a president of the National Medical Association in 1935,  and was active in the Meharry Alumni Association.

Philanthropy 
A religious Christian, Hale devoted most of his time and income to help out the black community of Nashville. He gave over 100 free lectures and clinics. He and his wife did not charge indigent patients at Millie E. Hale Hospital, performing medical procedures for free and paying for medicines out of their own pocket. The family gradually converted their family home at 419 Fourth Ave South into a community center — a meeting place of numerous organizations working to improve the lives of local people. Hales distributed free food and provided home care to the poorest people in their community.

Personal life and death 
Friends described Hale as a "colorful personality." He was a physically large man, often called "Big John." His friends and colleagues also noted Hale to be tempered and religious.

Hale married his first wife, Millie E. (Gibson) Hale, on December 20, 1905. They had three children: John Henry Jr. (1913–1914), Essie Margaret, and Mildred (Hale) Freeman (1908–1986). Mildred followed in her mother's footsteps, graduating from Fisk University. She was active in the black community and served on boards of the National Medical Association and Young Women's Christian Association. She promoted religion in the community, and worked as a nurse and a school teacher. She married Samuel Henry Freeman (1898–1949), Hale's student and later the first black doctor to receive master's degree in Orthopedics.

After his first wife's premature death in 1930, Hale married Carrie (Jordan) Hale (b. 1901). The couple then lived at 623 Seventh Avenue South, as Hale's first home remained a community center.

In his later years, Hale developed cardiovascular disease; however, he continued to operate, even exhibiting severe symptoms. He died on March 27, 1944 of coronary insufficiency at Hubbard Hospital, and was buried at in Greenwood Cemetery in Nashville.

Legacy 
Hale is credited for significant and extensive contributions to the development of African-American medicine, teaching many young physicians who "beloved and admired" him. He became "famous" and "internationally known" for his medical work. Dr. Edward L. Turner, the president of Meharry Medical College in 1944, believed that Hale "had more influence than any other man in the encouragement and development of Negro surgeons." Hale's student, Matthew Walker Sr., who succeeded Hale at his post at Meharry, remembered Hale as "a brilliant teacher." His two other students remembered him as a professor who "captivated the student body."

Meharry colleagues eulogized Hale as the "dean of American Negro surgeons." A mural and a portrait of Hale was installed in Meharry Medical College in 1951 As of 2018, Hale was inducted into the Tennessee Healthcare Hall of Fame.

A 500-dwelling public housing project on Charlotte Avenue in Nashville was named after Hale, and as of 2013, served as a nationwide example of a successful HOPE VI development, a housing project with mixed-income integration.

The California chapter of the National Medical Association was named the John Hale Medical Society. At the time of its construction in 1969, a medical center at the corner of Fresno Street and Irwin Avenue in Fresno, California was named the John Henry Hale Medical Center.

See also 
 Millie E. Hale Hospital
 African Americans in Tennessee
 Robert F. Boyd

Notes

References

Literature cited 

1878 births
1944 deaths
People from Franklin County, Tennessee
American surgeons
Walden University (Tennessee) alumni
Meharry Medical College alumni
20th-century surgeons
African-American physicians
20th-century African-American people